David Watt Ballantyne (14 June 1924 – 24 February 1986) was a New Zealand journalist, novelist and short story writer.

Ballantyne was born in Auckland, New Zealand on 14 June 1924.
After a brief episode in the military and after not completing his medical studies, he began his career as a journalist at the Auckland Star. In 1948, he published his first novel, The Cunninghams in the United States. He finished Freeman’s Bay, a novel about Auckland working-class life, in 1950, but it was not accepted by either his American or his New Zealand publisher.

Ballantyne married the painter Jean Vivienne Margaret Heise in 1950, with whom he had a son. In 1954 he moved with his family to London, where he continued working as a journalist and author. In 1966, the family returned to New Zealand.

Ballantyne died at his home in Ponsonby in inner-city Auckland in 1986.

He published eight novels, of which the first The Cunninghams and the fifth, Sydney Bridge Upside Down are recognised as New Zealand literary classics.

Novels by David Ballantyne  
The Cunninghams (1948)
The Last Pioneer (1963) 
A Friend of the Family (1966) 
Sydney Bridge Upside Down (1968) 
The Talkback Man (1978) 
The Penfriend (1980) 
And the Glory (1983)

References

External links
David Ballantynel (novelist)
The Last Pioneer (novel) 
 

1924 births
1986 deaths
New Zealand male novelists
New Zealand male short story writers
20th-century New Zealand novelists
20th-century New Zealand short story writers
20th-century New Zealand male writers
20th-century New Zealand journalists